Varanasi Ram Madhav (born 22 August 1964) is an Indian politician who served as the National General Secretary of the Bharatiya Janata Party. He was a member of the National Executive of the Rashtriya Swayamsevak Sangh and has authored a few books. His latest is Uneasy Neighbours: India and China after Fifty Years of the War.

Early life
Madhav was born in the East Godavari district of Andhra Pradesh on 22 August 1964. Primarily a student of engineering, he earned his Diploma in Electrical Engineering from Andhra Pradesh. He also has a post-graduate degree in Political Science from the University of Mysore, Karnataka.

Political career

Madhav's association with the Rashtriya Swayamsevak Sangh began as a teenager. He volunteered to be a full-time worker for RSS in 1981. He was assigned to several key positions in the organization.

He has also been the editor of Bharatiya Pragna, a monthly magazine in English published by Pragna Bharati, and associate editor of Jagriti, a Telugu weekly. He worked as a journalist for over 20 years with RSS sponsored publications and has authored more than twelve books. He serves as the Member of the Board of Governors of India Foundation, a New Delhi-based think-tank focused on the issues, challenges and opportunities of the Indian polity. He is also a mentor at Vision India Foundation, a New Delhi-based think tank working on public leadership amongst youth

He served as the national spokesperson of the RSS from 2003 to 2014. Madhav was seconded to the BJP and appointed as one of its national general secretaries in 2014.

As a General Secretary of the Bharatiya Janata Party, he is credited for the rise of the party in North East India and stitching alliance with regional parties.

Personal views

Foreign policy
He has called for India to take a more "proactive role in the region” in order to check China's One Belt One Road Initiative.  He was involved in the BJP's entry to the International Democrat Union, a worldwide grouping of right of centre political parties.

Reception

British anchor Mehdi Hasan's interview 
On the talk show called Head to Head in Al Jazeera, a Qatari news channel, anchored by Mehdi Hasan on Hindu Nationalism, Ram Madhav's statement on 'your' ISIS to the British anchor with an explanation later published in Indian Express calling it just a slip of tongue  After the show, the anchor Mehdi Hasan stated that he was being called as ISIS supporter since then by internet trolls.

Books
Uneasy neighbours : India and China after 50 years of the war, New Delhi : Har-Anand Publications, 2014, 256 p

Hindutva Paradigm

References

Further reading
 

Bharatiya Janata Party politicians from Andhra Pradesh
Hindu revivalist writers
Activists from Andhra Pradesh
1964 births
People from East Godavari district
Living people
Rashtriya Swayamsevak Sangh pracharaks
University of Mysore alumni
People from Andhra Pradesh
Telugu people